Peter Roy (February 23, 1828 – June 21, 1881) was an American farmer and politician.

Roy was born in Rainy Lake, Koochiching County, Minnesota and was of French and Ojibwe descent. He went to school in La Pointe, Wisconsin, was a farmer, and served an interpreter for the Long Lake Agency. Roy lived in Belle Plaine, Scott County, Minnesota with his wife and family. He served in the Minnesota Territorial House of Representatives in 1854 and in the Minnesota House of Representatives in 1859 and 1860 and in 1862; he was a Democrat. Roy died in Little Falls, Minnesota

References

1828 births
1881 deaths
American people of Ojibwe descent
People from Belle Plaine, Minnesota
People from Koochiching County, Minnesota
Farmers from Minnesota
Members of the Minnesota Territorial Legislature
Democratic Party members of the Minnesota House of Representatives